DOTMLPF (pronounced "Dot-M-L-P-F") is an acronym for doctrine, organization, training, materiel, leadership and education, personnel, and facilities.  It is used by the United States Department of Defense  and was defined in the Joint Capabilities Integration Development System, or JCIDS Process  as the framework to design what administrative changes and/or acquisition efforts would fill a capability need   required to accomplish a mission. Because combatant commanders define requirements in consultation with the Office of the Secretary of Defense (OSD), they are able to consider gaps in the context of strategic direction for the total US military force and influence the direction of requirements earlier in the acquisition process, in particular, materiel.

It also serves as a mnemonic for staff planners to consider certain issues prior to undertaking a new effort.  
Doctrine
Organization
Training
Materiel
Leadership
Personnel
Facilities

Here is an example of how DOTMLPF would be interpreted in the military context:

Doctrine: the way they fight, e.g., emphasizing maneuver warfare combined air-ground campaigns.
Organization: how they organize to fight; divisions, air wings, Marine-Air Ground Task Forces (MAGTFs), etc.
Training: how they prepare to fight tactically; basic training to advanced individual training, various types of unit training, joint exercises, etc.
Materiel: all the “stuff” necessary to equip our forces that DOES NOT require a new development effort (weapons, spares, test sets, etc that are “off the shelf” both commercially and within the government)
Leadership and education: how they prepare their leaders to lead the fight from squad leader to 4-star general/admiral; professional development.
Personnel: availability of qualified people for peacetime, wartime, and various contingency operations
Facilities: real property; installations and industrial facilities (e.g. government owned ammunition production facilities) that support the forces.

The idea is to fix the capability gap, and CJCSI 3170.01G – Joint Capabilities Integration and Development System, 1 March 2009, is the one governing instruction that encompasses both materiel (requiring new defense acquisition programs) and non-materiel (not requiring new defense acquisition program) solutions. 

The Defense Acquisition University Glossary gives the following definitions. 

 Material: Elements, constituents, or substances of which something is composed or can be made. It includes, but is not limited to, raw and processed material, parts, components, assemblies, fuels, and other items that may be worked into a more finished form in performance of a contract.
 Materiel: Equipment, apparatus, and supplies used by an organization or institution.
 Material specification: Applicable to raw material (chemical compound), mixtures (cleaning agents, paints), or semi-fabricated material (electrical cable, copper tubing) used in the fabrication of a product. Normally, a material specification applies to production, but may be prepared to control the development of a material.
 Materiel solution: A new item (including ships, tanks, self-propelled weapons, aircraft, etc., and related spares, repair parts, and support equipment, but excluding real property, installations, and utilities), developed or purchased to satisfy one or more capability requirements (or needs) and reduce or eliminate one or more capability gaps.

DOTMLPF-P 
During the US Army's process of developing and fielding laser Directed Energy-Maneuver Short-Range Air Defense (DE-MSHORAD) on Strykers, the Army Rapid Capabilities and Critical Technologies Office (RCCTO) has established an "Octagon"— a stakeholder forum for doctrine, organization, training, materiel, leadership and education, personnel, facilities, and policy.

Similar acronyms 

NATO uses a similar acronym, DOTMLPF-I, the "I" standing for "Interoperability": the ability to be interoperable with forces throughout the NATO alliance.

UK Ministry of Defence uses the acronym TEPID-OIL.

Recent JCIDS issuances expand this to DOTMLPF-P or DOTmLPF-P, where the second P refers to "Policy".

Joint Staff's J6 Joint Deployable Analysis Team (JDAT) validates DOTMLPF recommendations.

References

External links 

 DOTmLPF - P analysis   Acquipedia entry on DOTmLPF 
 Current JCIDS Manual and CJCSI 3170.01 at DAU

United States Department of Defense
Military terminology of the United States